The Women's Parallel in the 2021 FIS Alpine Skiing World Cup consisted of only 1 event, a parallel giant slalom, due to the COVID-19 pandemic. The tentative schedule had called for three parallel events, but the other two (scheduled for St. Moritz and Davos, Switzerland) were removed to limit the amount of travel during the pandemic.

The sole event was won by Petra Vlhová, who thus won the season championship, although a crystal globe was not awarded for it due to the limited events.

This specific championship includes both parallel giant slalom and parallel slalom races. At this time, parallel races are not included in the season finals, being held in 2021 in Lenzerheide, Switzerland.

The season was interrupted by the 2021 World Ski Championships, which were held from 8–21 February in Cortina d'Ampezzo, Italy.  The women's parallel giant slalom was held on 16 February 2021.

Standings

DNS = Did Not Start
DNQ = Did Not Qualify

See also
 2021 Alpine Skiing World Cup – Women's summary rankings
 2021 Alpine Skiing World Cup – Women's Overall
 2021 Alpine Skiing World Cup – Women's Downhill
 2021 Alpine Skiing World Cup – Women's Super-G
 2021 Alpine Skiing World Cup – Women's Giant Slalom
 2021 Alpine Skiing World Cup – Women's Slalom
 World Cup scoring system

References

External links
 Alpine Skiing at FIS website

Women's Parallel
FIS Alpine Ski World Cup women's parallel discipline titles